Antoni Ponce Bertran (born 5 June 1987) is a Spanish Paralympic swimmer. He represented Spain at the 2016 and 2020 Summer Paralympics.

Career
Ponce Bertran represented Spain in the men's 200 metre freestyle S5 event at the 2020 Summer Paralympics and won a silver medal. He currently holds both the Paralympic record and the World record in 100m breastsroke in the category SB5.

References

1987 births
Living people
Spanish male breaststroke swimmers
Spanish male freestyle swimmers
Paralympic swimmers of Spain
Swimmers at the 2016 Summer Paralympics
Swimmers at the 2020 Summer Paralympics
Medalists at the 2020 Summer Paralympics
Medalists at the World Para Swimming Championships
Paralympic silver medalists for Spain
Paralympic medalists in swimming
S5-classified Paralympic swimmers